Dede-Ichyotuy (Deede Üshöötei) is a rural locality (a selo) in Dzhidinsky District, Republic of Buryatia, Russia. The population was 1,054 as of 2017. There are 41 streets.

Geography 
Dede-Ichyotuy is located 22 km northeast of Petropavlovka (the district's administrative centre) by road. Tsagatuy and Petropavlovka are the nearest rural localities.

References 

Rural localities in Dzhidinsky District